KGAS may refer to:

 KGAS (AM), a radio station (1590 AM) in Carthage, Texas, United States
 KGAS-FM, a radio station (104.3 FM) in Carthage, Texas, United States